Leonidas Kyvelidis (born 8 February 1986) is a Greek professional footballer who plays as a striker for Pierikos.

Career
Kyvelidis played the majority of his career in Beta and Gamma Ethniki teams, namely Pierikos, Egaleo, Chaidari and Panachaiki. He was named top scorer of the 2009–10 Gamma Ethniki, having scored 24 goals for Panachaiki.

References

External links
Doxa Drama squad at uefa.com

1986 births
Living people
Doxa Drama F.C. players
Panachaiki F.C. players
Egaleo F.C. players
Chaidari F.C. players
Pierikos F.C. players
Panthrakikos F.C. players
PAE Kerkyra players
PAS Giannina F.C. players
Apollon Smyrnis F.C. players
Apollon Pontou FC players
Aris Thessaloniki F.C. players
A.E. Karaiskakis F.C. players
Super League Greece players
Greek footballers
Association football forwards
People from Jambyl Region